Al Nejashi Mosque is a mosque in Negash, in the Tigray Region of Ethiopia. Named after Najashi, it is one of the oldest mosques in Africa.

History 

The mosque was established in the 7th century C.E. In 2018, the mosque was renovated with funds from Turkish Cooperation and Coordination Agency. Accommodations, visitor center and toilets were built around the mosque building. Renovation was completed in September 2018.

In 2021, the mosque was damaged during clashes between Ethiopian and Eritrean government forces and the Tigray People's Liberation Front. The minaret was destroyed, its dome partially collapsed and its façade was ruined. Soon afterwards, the Government of Ethiopia vowed to repair the building.

Architecture 
The mosque complex features tomb behind the main mosque building. There are 15 tombs of the first immigrants in Islam to Ethiopia .

See also 
 Afro-Arabs
 List of mosques
 List of mosques in Africa
 Mosque of the Companions, Massawa, Eritrea
 Lists of mosques

References

External links 

7th-century mosques
Mosques in Ethiopia
Tigray Region